WTMZ may refer to:

 WTMZ (AM), a radio station (910 AM) licensed to serve Dorchester Terrace–Brentwood, South Carolina, United States
 WTMZ-FM, a radio station (98.9 FM) licensed to serve McClellanville, South Carolina